Płaczek is a Polish surname. It is derived from the noun płacz, "crying".
Notable people with the surname Płaczek or Placzek include:

Abraham Placzek (1799–1884), Moravian rabbi
Adrianna Płaczek (born 1993), Polish handball player
Baruch Placzek (1834–1922), Moravian rabbi and writer
George Placzek (1905–1955), Czech physicist
Joyce Placzek (1901–1953), English writer under name of Jan Struther
Marysia Placzek, British neuroscientist
Otto Placzek (1884–1968), German sculptor
Siegfried Placzek (1866–1946), German neurologist and psychiatrist

See also
Plaček, Czech surname of the same origin
Placek
Placzek transient, a concept in nuclear engineering

Polish-language surnames
Surnames from nicknames